The 2017–18 Segona Divisió, also known as the Lliga Biosphere, was the 19th season of second-tier football in Andorra. This season began on 23 September 2017 and ended on 13 May 2018.

Inter Club d'Escaldes won the league in the previous season and were promoted along with second-placed Penya Encarnada to the 2017–18 Primera Divisió.

Format
Ten clubs competed for the league title. The clubs played each other twice for a total of 18 matches for each club. The three "B" teams could not be promoted. Five clubs then advanced to a play-off to determine which club would be promoted.

League table

Results

Play–off round

Results

See also
2017–18 Primera Divisió
2018 Copa Constitució

References

External links
 

Segona Divisió seasons
2017–18 in Andorran football
Andorra